Bărăşti may refer to several places in Romania:

Bărăști, a commune in Olt County
Bărăşti, a village in Albac Commune, Alba County
Bărăşti, a village in Cicănești Commune, Argeș County
Bărăşti, a village in Cislău Commune, Buzău County
Bărăşti, a village in Coloneşti Commune, Olt County
Bărăşti, a village in Morunglav Commune, Olt County
Bărăşti, a village in Boroaia Commune, Suceava County